Fadey Sargsyan (September 18, 1923 – January 11, 2010) was an Armenian scientist and politician.

Sargsyan served as the Chairman of the Council of Ministers of the Armenian Soviet Socialist Republic from 1977 to 1989.

He was later the President of the Armenian National Academy of Sciences from 1993 to 2006.

References

1923 births
2010 deaths
Armenian scientists
Politicians from Yerevan
Heads of government of the Armenian Soviet Socialist Republic
Recipients of the Order of Lenin
Recipients of the USSR State Prize
Foreign Members of the Russian Academy of Sciences

Yerevan Computer Research and Development Institute